Per Fredrik Johansson (born February 27, 1984) is a Swedish former professional ice hockey centre, who last played for VIK Västerås HK in HockeyAllsvenskan.

Playing career
In 2002, Johansson was drafted in the ninth round, 274th overall, by the Edmonton Oilers in the 2002 NHL Entry Draft. He made his Swedish Hockey League (SHL) debut during the 2002–03 season. Johansson was selected to represent Team Sweden at the 2004 World Junior Ice Hockey Championships.  On 1 June 2006, the Edmonton Oilers  signed Johansson to an entry level contract, and he was later re-assigned to Frölunda HC of the Swedish Elitserien.

On 26 September 2007, Johansson was assigned to the Oilers American Hockey League (AHL) affiliate, the Springfield Falcons to begin the 2007–08 season. He was later assigned to their ECHL affiliate, the Stockton Thunder. The following season, Johansson returned to VIK Västerås HK.

As a result of abdominal muscle surgery, Johansson recorded limited playing time during the 2011–12 and 2012–13 season. He returned to the ice in August 2013.

Johansson was named captain of VIK Västerås HK in January 2016. During the 2018–19 season, Johansson recorded his 200th point during a 2–1 win over the Vita Hästen. Johansson agreed to a one year contract extension with VIK Västerås HK in February 2019.

Personal life
In August 2013, Johansson revealed his daughter had leukemia. He started a fundraiser for the Children's Cancer Foundation which raised around SEK 150,000.

His cousin Joakim Andersson also plays professional hockey.

Career statistics

Regular season and playoffs

International

References

External links

1984 births
Edmonton Oilers draft picks
Frölunda HC players
Living people
Springfield Falcons players
Swedish ice hockey centres
People from Munkedal Municipality
Sportspeople from Västra Götaland County